The following table shows all of the themed areas found in each of the Universal Destinations & Experiences around the world:

Key:

See also
 List of Universal theme park attractions
 List of properties at Universal Destinations & Experiences

Universal Parks & Resorts lists
Themed areas in amusement parks